Shesh Khela is a 1992 Bangladeshi drama film.  The film has been directed by Noor Hossain Bolai.  The film stars Manna and Chompa in lead roles.

Synopsis
The film's story revolves around an immigrant educated young man's life.

Cast
Manna
Chompa
 Wasimul Bari Rajib
Ahmed Sharif
 Sharmili Ahmed
Black Anwar

Soundtrack
The film's songs are composed by Alam Khan and pemned by Moniruzzaman Monir

"Sundor Sondhyay" - Runa Laila, Andrew Kishore, Syed Abdul Hadi 
"Je Banailo Tomare Jotno Kore" - Runa Laila, Andrew Kishore
"Tumi Ja Bhebechho Amay" - Sabina Yasmin 
"Kachhe Ele Jibon Pai" - Sabina Yasmin, Andrew Kishore

References

External links
 
Shesh Khela at BFA

Bengali-language Bangladeshi films
1992 films
1990s Bengali-language films
Films scored by Alam Khan